Léon Level (12 July 1910 in Hédouville – 26 March 1949 in Paris) was a French professional road bicycle racer.

Major results

1933
Tour de France:
7th place overall classification
1935
Circuit du Mont-Blanc
Trophée des Grimpeurs
1936
Tour de France:
Winner stage 9
10th place overall classification

External links 

Official Tour de France results for Léon Level

French male cyclists
1910 births
1949 deaths
French Tour de France stage winners
Sportspeople from Val-d'Oise
Tour de Suisse stage winners
Cyclists who died while racing
Sport deaths in France
Cyclists from Île-de-France